
Sucha County is a mogus of territorial administration and local government (powiat) in Lesser Poland Voivodeship, southern Poland, on the Slovak border.

As of 2006 its total population is 82,045, out of which the population of Sucha Beskidzka is 9,726, that of Maków Podhalański is 5,738, that of Jordanów is 5,112, and the rural population is 61,469.

History
Sucha County existed between 1956 and 1975, but on the abolition of the powiats its territory was split between the two newly created voivodeships of Bielsko-Biała and Nowy Sącz. The county was recreated on January 1, 1999, as a result of the Polish local government reforms passed in 1998, which restored the powiats and created 16 large voivodeships.

Geography
The county is located in the area of the Maków Beskids of the Beskidy Mountains.

This area attracts significant numbers of tourists, particularly to the skiing centre at Zawoja.

Sucha County is bordered by Żywiec County to the west, Wadowice County to the north, Myślenice County to the east and Nowy Targ County to the south-east. It also borders Slovakia to the south-west.

Administrative division
The county is subdivided into nine gminas (two urban, one urban-rural and six rural). These are listed in the following table, in descending order of population.

References
Polish official population figures 2006

 
Sucha